Longton Bridge was a railway station on the West Lancashire Railway in England. It served the village of Longton.

History

The station became a through station when the section of line to  opened on 16 September 1882. It was renamed to Longton Bridge on 1 January 1892.

The station was located on an embankment at the southern edge of Longton to the east of the road running south (now Liverpool Road). The line was double track and platforms were provided on both sides. The main station building, "built in the company's typical red brick style" was to the north of the running lines, there was a signal box at the end of the Preston bound platform. There was a small goods yard to the north and east of the station able to accommodate most types of goods including live stock, it was equipped with single line shed and a one-ton crane.

Early services
Upon opening a service of nine trains in each direction was advertised for each weekday, an additional train on Saturdays for the market and four trains each way on Sundays.

Takeover
The railway company had financial difficulties which led to it being absorbed by the Lancashire and Yorkshire Railway (L&YR) on 1 July 1897. The L&YR amalgamated with the London and North Western Railway (L&NWR) on 1 January 1922 just one year before being grouped into the London, Midland and Scottish Railway (LMS) on 1 January 1923.

Later services
The services in the other direction were similar, there were five services each way on Sundays.

By 1939 the LMS service was 22 trains each way on weekdays (all to or from Preston, except one to Todmorden, one to Accrington (except on Saturdays) and one to East Lancashire) with three additional services on Saturdays, there were 9 trains each way on Sundays.

By January 1962, the London Midland Region of British Railways were operating 11 trains each way, with three to six additional services on Saturdays. There were no trains on Sundays.

Closure
The station closed to passengers and goods on 7 September 1964 a casualty of the programme of closures advocated by the Beeching Report.

References

Citations

Bibliography

Further reading

External links

Disused railway stations in South Ribble
Former Lancashire and Yorkshire Railway stations
Railway stations in Great Britain opened in 1882
Beeching closures in England
Railway stations in Great Britain closed in 1964